Ivan Peko (born 5 January 1990) is a Croatian professional footballer who plays for First League of FBiH club GOŠK Gabela.

Career
He had a spell with Austrian second tier-side Horn.

Honours
Dinamo Zagreb
1. HNL: 2012–13

Zrinjski Mostar
Bosnian Premier League: 2015–16, 2016–17

References

External links
 

1990 births
Living people
People from Široki Brijeg
Croats of Bosnia and Herzegovina
Association football midfielders
Croatian footballers
Bosnia and Herzegovina footballers
Croatia youth international footballers
GNK Dinamo Zagreb players
NK Lokomotiva Zagreb players
NK Široki Brijeg players
HŠK Zrinjski Mostar players
NK Vitez players
SV Horn players
NK Neretva players
NK GOŠK Gabela players
2. Liga (Austria) players
Croatian Football League players
Premier League of Bosnia and Herzegovina players
First League of the Federation of Bosnia and Herzegovina players
Croatian expatriate footballers
Expatriate footballers in Austria
Croatian expatriate sportspeople in Austria